Tons of Fun may refer to:

 Ton of Fun, a silent film comedy team
 "Tons of Fun" (Pee-wee's Playhouse), an episode of Pee-wee's Playhouse

See also
 Two Tons O' Fun, an alternate name for the pop act The Weather Girls